Leicester station is a historic railway station located at Leicester, New York in Livingston County, New York.  It is a 1-story, two-by-four-bay brick building surmounted by a hipped roof with broad overhanging eaves.  It was built in 1915 in the Arts and Crafts style.
	
It was listed on the National Register of Historic Places in 2005 as the Delaware, Lackawanna & Western Railroad Station.

References

Railway stations on the National Register of Historic Places in New York (state)
Buildings and structures in Livingston County, New York
Leicester, New York
American Craftsman architecture in New York (state)
Railway stations in the United States opened in 1915
1915 establishments in New York (state)
National Register of Historic Places in Livingston County, New York
Former railway stations in New York (state)